The Illinois general election was held on November 8, 2016.

Primaries were held March 15.

In addition to federal races for President, Senate, and House, all 118 seats of the Illinois House of Representatives and 40 seats (out of 59) of the Illinois Senate were up for election, a special election was held for Illinois Comptroller, judicial elections were held, and a statewide ballot measure was voted upon.

Election information

Turnout

Primary election
For the primary election, turnout was 46.56%, with 3,569,960 votes cast. Over 520,000 of votes cast were done so as early votes. 

Turnout by county

General election
For the general election, turnout was 70.56%, with 5,666,118 votes cast.

Turnout by county

Federal elections

United States President

United States Senate

United States House

All of Illinois' 18 seats in the United States House of Representatives were up for election in 2016.

The Democratic Party flipped one Republican-held seat, making the composition of Illinois' House delegation 11 Democrats and 7 Republicans.

State elections

Comptroller

State House of Representatives 

Democrats retained the majority in the State House of Representatives. However, they lost their veto-proof supermajority, as Republicans gained seats.

State Senate

Democrats retained the majority in the State Senate.

Judicial elections

Judicial elections were held. These consisted of both partisan and retention elections, including those for seven seats in the Illinois Appellate Court.

Ballot measure
Illinois voters voted  a single ballot measure in 2016. In order to be approved, the measure required either 60% support among those specifically voting on the amendment or 50% support among all ballots cast in the elections.

Illinois Transportation Taxes and Fees Lockbox Amendment

Illinois voters approved the Illinois Transportation Taxes and Fees Lockbox Amendment, a legislatively referred constitutional amendment that prohibits lawmakers from using transportation funds for anything other than their stated purpose. In order to be approved, the measure required either 60% support among those specifically voting on the amendment or 50% support among all ballots cast in the elections.

Local elections
Local elections were held. These included county elections, such as the Cook County elections.

Notes

References

 
Illinois